La Thuile may refer to:

 La Thuile, Aosta Valley, a commune in Italy
 La Thuile, Savoie, a commune in France
 Lathuile, a commune in France